Mitromorpha sama is a species of sea snail, a marine gastropod mollusk in the family Mitromorphidae.

Description
The length of the shell attains 6.6 mm.

Distribution
This marine species occurs off Southeastern Brazil

References

 Simone L. R. L. & Cunha C. M. (2012) Taxonomic study on the molluscs collected in Marion-Dufresne expedition (MD55) to SE Brazil: Xenophoridae, Cypraeoidea, mitriforms and Terebridae (Caenogastropoda). Zoosystema 34(4): 745–781

External links
 MNHN, Paris: Mitromorpha sama (holotype)
 

sama
Gastropods described in 2012